What Women Suffer is a 1911 Australian silent film directed by Alfred Rolfe. It is a Victorian melodrama, complete with a climax where a little child is placed on a moving saw bench and is considered a lost film.

Plot
In England, Edith Norton is married to a dashing naval officer, Lt Coventry, who bears a resemblance to Jack Baxter, a common thief. Edith's father is killed by Baxter and Coventry is framed for this by the evil Herbert Standish who has designs on Edith. Partly convicted on the testimony of his son, Cedric, Coventry is thrown in prison.

Years earlier Standish had abandoned Nance, daughter of the old gardener, Meredith, leaving her to starve. She married Baxter, who gave her a terrible life.

Edith and Cedric are lured to a sawmill by a forged letter from Standish. Standish places the boy on a saw bench and threatens to cut him unless the girl marries her. But Coventry escapes from prison in time to rescue the boy and the girl. Baxter confesses and Coventry and Edith are reunited.

The chapter headings were:
The return of Lt Coventry
The fatal resemblance
The Murder on the Lawn
Coventry accused of the crime
His own child convicts him
The daring escape from the quarry
The great thrilling sawmill scene
Out of the jaws of death
At the point of the revolver
The confession
Hunted by the police
Freedom at last.

Cast
Alfred Rolfe as Lt Coventry
Ethel Phillips as Edith
Stanley Walpole as Standish
Charles Villiers

Original Play

The film was based on a popular four-act melodrama which had been produced on the Australian stage by Philip Lytton.

Production
According to contemporary reports the film "was produced at enormous cost solely for the Lyric" Theatre in Melbourne.

Release
The film proved popular with audiences when screened at the two Lyric Theatres in Brunswick and Prahan in Melbourne. It later screened in Sydney, Adelaide and throughout the country. Box office reception was strong.

The Evening News called the film "a triumph in that art of cinematography... the lead parts are well sustained.

References

External links
 
What Women Suffer at AustLit
What Women Suffer original play at AustLit

Australian black-and-white films
Australian silent feature films
Lost Australian films
Films directed by Alfred Rolfe
1911 films